The Miss República Dominicana 2009 was held at the Sans Souci Convention Center in Santo Domingo Este on May 17, 2009. The winner represented the Dominican Republic at Miss Universe 2009. The first runner-up entered  Hispanoamericana 2009, the second runner-up entered Miss Continente Americano 2009, the third runner-up entered Miss Globe International 2010, and the fourth runner-up entered in Miss Bikini International 2010. Dayana Mendoza, Miss Universe 2008, was invited to the pageant.

Results

Candidates

References

External links
Profile on Miss Universe website

Miss Dominican Republic
2009 in the Dominican Republic
2009 beauty pageants